Ange Le Strat (18 February 1918 – 8 December 1999) was a French racing cyclist. He rode in the 1947 and 1949 Tour de France.

References

External links
 

1918 births
1999 deaths
French male cyclists
Sportspeople from Morbihan
Cyclists from Brittany